Quick Change World is the fourth solo album released by Ric Ocasek, who was the lead singer and songwriter for The Cars.  This was his second and final release for Reprise Records.

Ocasek's fourth solo album was originally intended to be Negative Theater, an album consisting of a double CD and a book of poetry.  However, in North America, Reprise Records declined to release the CD in Ocasek's original form.  Instead, the company had him record 7 additional tracks with producer Mike Shipley, and added them to 7 tracks from Ocasek's Negative Theater project.  The resulting 14-song record was issued as Quick Change World in North America only.  (The Shipley-produced tracks comprise the "Right Side" of Quick Change World; the "Left Side" consists of Ocasek-produced Negative Theater tracks.) Stylistically, the right side represents pop rock in the vein of The Cars (the song "Hard Times" was initially intended for the Cars' album Heartbeat City) while the left-side represents experimental music.

Negative Theater was issued as a 15-track CD in Europe only.  It includes the 7 "Left Side" tracks that were issued on Quick Change World, and 8 tracks that are exclusive to the Negative Theater album.

Track listing
All tracks composed by Ric Ocasek
Right side
 "The Big Picture"
 "Don't Let Go"
 "Hard Times"
 "A Little Closer"
 "Riding Shotgun"
 "Feeling's Got to Stay"
 "She's On"
Left side
 "I Still Believe"
 "Come Alive"
 "Quick Change World"
 "What's on TV"
 "Hopped Up"
 "Help Me Find America"
 "Telephone Again" (hidden bonus track)

Personnel
Ric Ocasek - vocals, guitar, keyboards, artwork, photography
Thad Bernard, Charlie Pettus, Darryl Jenifer - bass
Eric Schermerhorn - guitar, E-bow
Roger Greenawalt - guitar
Greg Hawkes - keyboards
Milton Sutton - drums

Notes

Ric Ocasek albums
1993 albums
Albums produced by Ric Ocasek
Albums produced by Mike Shipley
Reprise Records albums